Long Term Effects of Suffering (stylized as Long Term Effects of SUFFERING) is the second studio album by American hip hop duo Suicideboys. It was released on August 13, 2021, via G*59 Records. Production was handled by member Budd Dwyer. The album was preceded by three singles: "New Profile Pic", "Avalon", and "Materialism as a Means to an End". The single "Avalon" was co-produced by former 808 Mafia member PVLACE.

In the United States, the album peaked at number seven on the Billboard 200, number three on the Top R&B/Hip-Hop Albums chart, number two on the Top Rap Albums chart, and number one on the Independent Albums chart. It also reached number eight in New Zealand, number twelve in Finland, and number eighteen in Australia.

Track listing

Charts

Weekly charts

Year-end charts

References

External links

2021 albums
Suicideboys albums